Forsyth is a village in Macon County, Illinois, United States. Its population was 3,734 at the 2020 census, up from 3,490 in 2010. It is included in the Decatur, Illinois Metropolitan Statistical Area.

History
The settlement of Forsyth dates to around 1854, when the Illinois Central Railroad came through Macon County. The village is named after Col. Robert Forsyth, the first general freight agent of the Illinois Central Railroad.

Geography
Forsyth is located in north-central Macon County at  (39.9258, -88.9593). It is bordered to the south by the city of Decatur, the county seat. U.S. Route 51 is the main highway through the village, leading south  to the center of Decatur and north  to Clinton. Interstate 72 runs along the southern border of Forsyth, with access from Exit 141 (US 51). I-72 leads northeast  to Champaign and west  to Springfield, the state capital.

Demographics

As of the census of 2000, there were 2,434 people, 903 households, and 728 families residing in the village. The racial makeup of the village was 96.96% White, 1.27% African American, 0.21% Native American, 1.31% Asian, 0.04% from other races, and 0.21% from two or more races. Hispanic or Latino people of any race were 0.49% of the population.

There were 903 households, out of which 37.7% had children under the age of 18 living with them, 74.4% were married couples living together, 4.7% had a female householder with no husband present, and 19.3% were non-families. 17.7% of all households were made up of individuals, and 10.5% had someone living alone who was 65 years of age or older. The average household size was 2.68 and the average family size was 3.05.

In the village, the population was spread out, with 28.1% under the age of 18, 4.3% from 18 to 24, 24.7% from 25 to 44, 29.7% from 45 to 64, and 13.2% who were 65 years of age or older. The median age was 41 years. For every 100 females, there were 96.0 males. For every 100 females age 18 and over, there were 92.9 males.

The median income for a household in the village was $69,000, and the median income for a family was $81,211. Males had a median income of $61,053 versus $33,125 for females. The per capita income for the village was $34,010. About 1.4% of families and 1.9% of the population were below the poverty line, including 2.1% of those under age 18 and 2.2% of those age 65 or over.

Public schools
K–12 public education in the Forsyth area is provided by the Forsyth Public School District.

 Maroa-Forsyth Grade School (mascot: Trojan)
 Maroa-Forsyth Middle School (mascot: Trojan)
 Maroa-Forsyth High School (mascot: Trojan)

Village logo 
At the start of 2019, the Village Board of Trustees voted to approve a new village logo. The previous logo had not been updated since the 1980s. The new logo puts an emphasis on the village's slogan, "Pride and Progress", while still maintaining the iconic green color that is so familiar to the community.

Economy
The Hickory Point Mall is located in Forsyth. The village of Forsyth's retail base is made up of brands such as Von Maur, Kohl's, Staples, Lowe's, Menard's, Hobby Lobby, TJ Maxx, and more.

Notable people

 Kevin Koslofski, outfielder for the Kansas City Royals (1992-1994) and Milwaukee Brewers (1996); graduate of Maroa-Forsyth High School

References

External links

 

Villages in Macon County, Illinois
Villages in Illinois